King's College is a Catholic liberal arts college in Wilkes-Barre, Pennsylvania. It is accredited by the Middle States Commission on Higher Education and located within the Diocese of Scranton.

History

King's College was founded in 1946 by Congregation of Holy Cross priests and brothers from the University of Notre Dame. The original mission of the college was to educate the sons of local miners and mill workers who lived in the Northeastern Pennsylvania region. The college's Administration Building indicates the links to the coal mining industry: Built in 1913, it was designed by Daniel Burnham of Chicago to serve as the [headquarters ] of the Lehigh Valley Coal Company.

The college's chapel, The Chapel of Christ the King, is located on West North Street.  It features a 4,200-pound anthracite altar, highlighting the relationship between the coal industry and the college. It was created for King's in 1954 by renowned African-American sculptor and Wilkes-Barre resident, C. Edgar Patience.

In June 1972, massive flooding occurred in downtown Wilkes-Barre. Rains from Tropical Storm Agnes caused the neighboring Susquehanna River to overflow and flood most of the campus.

Presidents

Campus

The campus covers nearly 50 acres in downtown Wilkes-Barre (adjacent to the Susquehanna River). Situated at the center of the campus, Monarch Court is the site of many campus community activities. The court includes a brick-paved area that encompasses a large King's Block K, also in brick, at its center. Each of the bricks surrounding the K is engraved with the names of students, alumni, and local businesses.

The Richard Abbas Alley Center for Health Sciences is home to academics programs such as Physician Assistant Studies, Athletic Training, and Exercise Science. It also includes student residences, an art and cultural display center, and a Chick-fil-A restaurant.

Many of King's athletic teams train and compete two miles from campus at the Robert L. Betzler Athletic Complex, a 33.5-acre athletic facility that includes McCarthy Stadium, a field house, and fields for baseball, softball, men's and women's soccer, football, and field hockey.

Administration
  Administration Building   – 133 North River Street

College halls
 Luksic Hall – corner of West Jackson and North Franklin Streets
 Benaglia Hall – North Franklin Street
 Hafey-Marian Hall – West Jackson Street (also located near the center of the campus)
 Holy Cross Hall – located near Monarch Court
 Hessel Hall – located near Monarch Court
 Esseff Hall – corner of North Main and West Jackson Streets
 Flood Hall – corner of Harrison and West North Streets
 Alumni Hall – corner of East Jackson and North Main Streets
 O'Hara Hall – corner of North Main and North Streets
 Richard Abbas Alley Center for Health Sciences – Wilkes-Barre Public Square

College courts
 Monarch Court – located near the center of the campus
 Moreau Court – located near West North Street
 Regina Court – located between Esseff Hall and the Sheehy-Farmer Campus Center

College centers and school(s)
 The William G. McGowan School of Business – King's undergraduate business school 
 Mulligan Physical Science Center – located behind the Administration Building (adjacent to the Theater)
 Charles E. & Mary Parente Life Sciences Center – corner of North River and West Jackson Streets
 Gym|Scandlon Physical Education Center – North Main Street
 Hessel Hall, Office of Admission – North Franklin Street
 Sheehy-Farmer Campus Center – located behind the Library and Esseff Hall

College houses
 John J. Lane House – North Franklin Street
 Kilburn House – North Franklin Street (formerly used as the college president's home)
 Sherrer House – corner of Spencer and North Franklin Streets

College places of interest
 The Chapel of Christ the King at the George and Giovita Maffei Family Commons - West North Street
 Maffei Theatre – located in the Administration Building
 D. Leonard Corgan Library – West Jackson Street
 Campus Ministry Center- corner of West Jackson and North Franklin Streets

College community buildings
 Holy Cross Community – North Franklin Street
 Holy Cross Community/Student Housing – North Franklin Street

Miscellaneous buildings
 Environmental Studies – located behind Benaglia Hall
 Alumni Engagement and Experience – North Franklin Street
 Human Resources – North Franklin Street
 Study Abroad – North Franklin Street
 Maintenance – Harrison Street (behind the gym)

Academics

King's College is an independent, coed, four-year Catholic college with 2,130 students. Founded in 1946 by Congregation of Holy Cross priests and brothers from the University of Notre Dame. King's academic programs are recognized by leading accrediting agencies, including the Association to Advance Collegiate Schools of Business (one of only 48 undergraduate schools of business in the country with this accreditation), the National Council for the Accreditation of Teacher Education, the Commission of Accreditation of Healthcare Management Education, the Accreditation Review Commission on Education for Physician Assistants, the Commission on Accreditation of Athletic Training Education, and the Middle States Commission on Higher Education.

King's grants bachelor's degrees in 40 majors (business, education, humanities, sciences, social sciences, and allied health programs), 11 concentrations, and seven pre-professional programs. All of the degree programs at King's encourage students to develop practical experience and skills that prepare them to pursue rewarding and successful careers. The college's newest programs include civil and mechanical engineering and nursing. The average class size is 18 with a student-to-faculty ratio of 12:1. The average GPA for entering first-year students is 3.4.

The college has 152 full-time and 77 part-time faculty members. Eighty-five percent of full-time faculty members have PhD or an equivalent terminal degrees (graduate assistants do not teach courses). Seventy percent of all enrolled students graduate from King's, and 99 percent of graduates are employed or attend graduate school within six months of graduation. King's also offers a Master of Science (M.S.) degree in health-care administration, a Master of Education (MEd) degree in reading or curriculum and instruction, and a five-year physician assistant studies program leading to a master's degree.

Student life

The college has more than fifty student organizations. King's 25 NCAA Division III teams include men's baseball, basketball, football, ice hockey, golf, lacrosse, soccer, swimming, tennis, track & field, and wrestling. Women's sports include basketball, field hockey, ice hockey, lacrosse, soccer, softball, swimming, tennis, track & field, and volleyball. The college also offers rugby and cheerleading as club sports. Intramural sports include basketball, flag football, indoor soccer, racquetball, and dodgeball.

Other co-curricular activities include academic clubs in almost every department: the King's Players (theater), Cantores Christi Regis (choir), Campus Ministry, the Experiencing the Arts Series, The Crown (student newspaper), the Regis (yearbook), and The Scop (literary magazine).

The college offers traditional dormitory housing and apartments. Traditional dorms include Esseff Hall (female freshmen only), Holy Cross Hall (male freshmen only), and Luksic Hall (a co-ed residence hall). Apartments include Alumni Hall (a four-story co-ed building), Flood Hall (co-ed), John Lane House (a three-story home), Gateway Corners (a three-story co-ed), and North Franklin Street (co-ed).

Extracurricular activities

Clubs and organizations
King's College recognizes 46 clubs and organizations. These clubs focus on academics (Biology Club and Psychology Club), service (Knights of Columbus, and Sigma Kappa Sigma), health related organizations (Sports Medicine Society), arts and sciences, international (Multicultural/International Club), media and publishing (Media Club), music and arts (Campion Society), and special interests (Student Allies For Equality, Anime Club, Young Americans for Liberty).

Media and publications

The King's College student-run radio station, WRKC ("Radio King's College") focuses on music but also covers live athletic events and sponsors a news program. . The college also sponsors The Crown, a weekly student newspaper. King's literary magazine, The Scop, is published twice every year and accepts written and visual submissions from current students and alumni.

The college has a closed-circuit campus television station, KCTV 10, which broadcasts shows such as a talk show ("King's Live"), a music competition ("King's Idol"), news, and sports.

Athletics

King's Division III teams include men's baseball, basketball, football, ice hockey, golf, lacrosse, soccer, swimming, tennis, track & field, and wrestling. Women's NCAA sports include basketball, field hockey, ice hockey, lacrosse, soccer, softball, swimming, tennis, track & field, and volleyball. The college also offers rugby & cheerleading as club sports. Intramural sports include basketball, flag football, indoor soccer, racquetball, and dodgeball.

Notable alumni
 Joseph James Farnan, Jr., United States federal judge
 Mark Ciavarella, former Luzerne County President Judge Court of Common Pleas, convicted in Kids for cash scandal, sentenced to 28 years in Federal Prison
 Frank G. Harrison, former United States Congressman
 Donora Hillard, author
 Pat Kennedy, former head basketball coach at several NCAA Division I programs, including Florida State University and DePaul University
 Dave Kotch, current CIO of FMC Corporation
 Thomas M. Leighton, former Wilkes-Barre mayor
 Santo Loquasto, Tony Award winning Broadway set and costume designer
 Bob MacKinnon Jr., Basketball Coach
 Francis T. McAndrew, psychologist/professor/author
 William G. McGowan, former MCI Communications chairman (Known for breaking up the Bell Telephone Company monopoly)
 Patrick J. Murphy, Under Secretary of the Army and Chief Management Officer (CMO); former United States Congressman
 Raphael J. Musto, former Pennsylvania state senator and former U.S. Congressman
 James L. Nelligan, former United States Congressman (later donated records to college as part of the Dan Flood/James Nelligan Archives)
 Paul F. Nichols, former member of the Virginia House of Delegates
 Thomas J. O'Hara, Provincial of the U.S. Province of Priests and Brothers of the Congregation of the Holy Cross; former president of King's College
 Thomas Tigue, former Pennsylvania State Representative

References

External links

 Official website
 Official athletics website

 
Holy Cross universities and colleges
Catholic universities and colleges in Pennsylvania
Liberal arts colleges in Pennsylvania
Educational institutions established in 1946
Buildings and structures in Wilkes-Barre, Pennsylvania
Universities and colleges in Luzerne County, Pennsylvania
1946 establishments in Pennsylvania